Rowland Pennington (1870 – 1929) was an English footballer who played in the Football League for Blackburn Rovers and Northwich Victoria.

References

1870 births
1929 deaths
English footballers
English Football League players
Blackburn Rovers F.C. players
Northwich Victoria F.C. players
Association football goalkeepers
FA Cup Final players